The 2010 Japanese Super Cup was held on 27 February 2010 between the 2009 J. League champions Kashima Antlers and the 2009 Emperor's Cup winner Gamba Osaka. The match was drawn 1–1 at the end of regulation time and Kashima Antlers went on to win the match 5–3 in penalties.

Match details

See also
2009 J. League Division 1
2009 Emperor's Cup

References

Japanese Super Cup
Super
Kashima Antlers matches
Gamba Osaka matches
Japanese Super Cup 2010